ECBC may refer to:

East Cornwall Bach Choir
Energy Conservation Building Code, in India
European Covered Bond Council, a financial organization
Edgewood Chemical Biological Center, a research facility of the U.S. Army
 Enterprise Cape Breton Corporation
Ethnic Catholic Blue-Collar, a significant voting bloc in U.S. elections
European Coffee Brewing Centre
Exeter College Boat Club, an Oxford University college rowing club
ECBC-MAC, a technique for constructing a message authentication code.